The Visayan Academy of Arts and Letters is a Philippine language regulator whose aims are to preserve and to develop the Cebuano language. In this regard, the Commission on the Filipino Language shares the same mission.

See also
 List of language regulators
 Sanghiran san Binisaya of the Waray language defunct

References

Language regulators
Cebuano language
Language advocacy organizations
Organizations established in 1995
1995 establishments in the Philippines